Egesina bifasciana is a species of beetle in the family Cerambycidae. It was described by Masaki Matsushita in 1933.

Subspecies
 Egesina bifasciana bifasciana Matsushita, 1933
 Egesina bifasciana tsushimae Breuning & Ohbayashi, 1964

References

Egesina
Beetles described in 1933